Thomas Burns, Tommy Burns or Tom Burns may refer to:

Politics
 Thomas Burns (politician) (born 1960), Nationalist Northern Irish politician
 Thomas Edward Burns (born 1927), Unionist Northern Irish politician
 Tom Burns (Australian politician) (1931–2007), former leader of the Australian Labor Party in Queensland

Sports
 Thomas H. Burns (1879–1913), Hall of Fame Champion jockey
 Oyster Burns (Thomas P. Burns, 1864–1928), Major League Baseball player
 Tom Burns (baseball) (1857–1902), Major League Baseball player
 Tom Burns (footballer) (1916–1993), Australian rules footballer
 Tommy Burns (Australian boxer) (1922–2011), Australian Boxing Hall of Famer
 Tommy Burns (Canadian boxer) (1881–1955), Canadian heavyweight boxing world champion
 Tommy Burns (Canadian football) (1910–1942), all-star and Grey Cup champion
 Tommy Burns (diver) (c1867–1897), English champion diver
 Tommy Burns (footballer) (1956–2008), Scottish football player and manager (Celtic, Kilmarnock, national team)
 T. P. Burns (1924–2018), Irish jockey
 Tom Burns (taekwondo)
 Horse murders#Tommy Burns, until 1991 arrest, a hired killer of heavily insured equestrian horses

Other persons
 Thomas Burns (minister, born 1796) (1796–1871), minister and founding settler of Dunedin, New Zealand
 Thomas Burns (minister, born 1853) (1853–1938), Scottish minister
 Thomas J. Burns (1923–1996), American accounting scholar and professor of accounting
 Thomas S. Burns, American historian
 Tom Burns (bishop) (born 1944), Catholic bishop
 Tom Burns (publisher) (1906–1995), British publisher
 Tom Burns (sociologist) (1913–2001), sociologist, author and founder of the Sociology department at the University of Edinburgh
 Tom R. Burns (born 1937), American/Swedish sociologist, professor of sociology at the University of Uppsala
 E. L. M. Burns (1897–1985), Canadian general, known as "Tommy"

See also
 Tommy Byrnes (1923–1981), American basketball player
 Thomas Byrne (disambiguation)
 Thomas Byrnes (disambiguation)